Eusattodera is a genus of skeletonizing leaf beetles in the family Chrysomelidae. There are about six described species in Eusattodera. They are found in North America.

Species
These six species belong to the genus Eusattodera:
 Eusattodera delta Wilcox, 1965
 Eusattodera intermixta (Fall, 1910)
 Eusattodera luteicollis (J. L. LeConte, 1868)
 Eusattodera pini Schaeffer, 1906
 Eusattodera rugosa (Jacoby, 1888)
 Eusattodera thoracica (F. E. Melsheimer, 1847)

References

Further reading

 
 
 
 

Galerucinae
Chrysomelidae genera
Articles created by Qbugbot
Taxa named by Charles Frederic August Schaeffer